Clarksfield is the code name for an Intel processor, initially sold as mobile Intel Core i7. It is closely related to the desktop Lynnfield processor, both use quad-core dies based on the 45 nm
Nehalem microarchitecture and have integrated PCI Express and DMI links.

The predecessor of Clarksfield, Penryn-QC was a multi-chip module with two dual-core Penryn dies based on Penryn microarchitecture, a shrink of Core microarchitecture. The name of the direct successor of Clarksfield has not been announced. Arrandale is a later mobile processor but opens a new line of mid-range dual-core processors with integrated graphics.

At the time of its release at the Intel Developer Forum on September 23, 2009, Clarksfield processors were significantly faster than any other laptop processor, including the Core 2 Extreme QX9300. The initial laptop manufacturers shipping products based on Clarksfield processors include MSI, Dell/Alienware, Hewlett-Packard, Toshiba and Asustek.

Brand names 
As of September 2009, all Clarksfield processors are marketed as Core i7, in three product lines differing in thermal design power and the amount of third-level cache that is enabled.
See the respective lists for details about each model.

See also 
 Intel Core i7
 List of Intel Core i7 microprocessors
 Penryn (microprocessor)
 Lynnfield (microprocessor)
 Arrandale (microprocessor)

References

External links
Intel – ARK – Products (formerly Clarksfield)

Intel microprocessors